John Ussher (1703 – 3 January 1749) was an Irish Member of Parliament.

He represented Dungarvan from 1747 to 1749.

His uncle John Ussher, nephew Richard Musgrave and first cousins Beverley Ussher and St George Ussher also served in the Irish House of Commons.

References
 http://thepeerage.com/p33481.htm#i334801
 https://web.archive.org/web/20090601105535/http://www.leighrayment.com/commons/irelandcommons.htm

1703 births
1749 deaths
Irish MPs 1727–1760
Members of the Parliament of Ireland (pre-1801) for County Waterford constituencies